Preston Athletic Football Club are a Scottish football club based in the town of Prestonpans, East Lothian. The club are nicknamed the Panners and play their home matches at Pennypit Park. The team play in dark blue.

History
Founded in 1945, they were originally a junior club and only entered the senior ranks in 1994 when they joined the East of Scotland Football League. As a full member of the Scottish Football Association, Preston are automatically eligible to enter the Scottish Cup. They first qualified for the competition proper in 2002–03, losing 1–0 at home to Hamilton Academical in the First Round.

The club applied unsuccessfully to join the Scottish Football League in 2000 and 2002. In 2008 Preston Athletic were one of five clubs to prepare an application for entry into the Scottish Football League following Gretna relinquishing their league status, however they were again unsuccessful after losing out to Annan Athletic.

At the end of the 2016–17 season Preston Athletic were relegated to the East of Scotland League, having spent four seasons in the Lowland League.

Honours
East of Scotland Football League First Division
 Winners: 2001–02
 Runners-up (2): 1994–95, 2011–12

King Cup
 Runners-up: 2017–18
Alex Jack Cup

 Winners: 1994–95

Notable players and coaches
The first professional coach of Preston Athletic was Paddy Buckley, a former Aberdeen and Scotland striker  whose son, Paddy Junior went on from Preston Athletic to play for Third Lanark, Wolverhampton Wanderers, Rotherham United and Sheffield United.

References

External links
 

Football clubs in Scotland
Football in East Lothian
Association football clubs established in 1945
1945 establishments in Scotland
East of Scotland Football League teams
Lowland Football League teams
Scottish Junior Football Association clubs
Prestonpans